Colonel César Yanes Urías (born 24 April 1920) is a Salvadoran politician and soldier who was a member of the Junta of Government, that ruled the country from 26 October 1960 until 25 January 1961. He was a member of the Salvadoran naval forces.

References 

1920 births
Living people
Salvadoran military personnel
Leaders who took power by coup
Salvadoran politicians
Men centenarians
Salvadoran centenarians